A chocolate fountain is a device for serving chocolate fondue. Typical examples resemble a stepped cone, standing 2–4 feet tall with a crown at the top and stacked tiers over a basin at the bottom. The basin is heated to keep the chocolate in a liquid state so it can be pulled into a center cylinder then vertically transported to the top of the fountain by an Archimedes screw. From there it flows over the tiers creating a chocolate "waterfall" in which food items like strawberries or marshmallows can be dipped.

History 

"Chocolate fountain machines" were invented by Ben Brisman and popularized in 1991 by a Canadian company called Design & Realisation. They did not become very popular until Design & Realisation began displaying these fountains at the National Restaurant Show in Chicago, starting in the early 1990s.

Jay Harlan (an entrepreneur and former Marriott catering executive) collaborated with D & R to introduce the chocolate fountain to the U.S. hotel and resort industry.  Jay Harlan's company (Buffet Enhancements International) began distributing the D & R fountain in the U.S. in 2001. It wasn't long after 2001 that Buffet Enhancements copied and improved the D & R fountain idea and began manufacturing their own American-made version.

Types 

Chocolate fountains can be categorized as commercial-use and personal-use. Commercial chocolate fountains can be categorized as Auger system and Pump system.

Commercial chocolate fountains usually range in size from about 20" inches to 50" inches tall and are designed for use in professional environments such as catering. These fountains are normally constructed of food-grade stainless steel and, as such, are quite durable. Depending on the model, commercial chocolate fountains may hold as much as 35 pounds of chocolate. Originally, chocolate fountains consisted of multiple tiers that formed curtains of chocolate. New models on the market now have a 'cup' design, dropping chocolate from cup to cup which can be much more chocolate efficient than traditional models, and save quite a lot of money.

Home chocolate fountains range in size up to about 19" tall.  They are primarily made of plastic and may have some stainless steel components (although all-stainless models do exist) and are usually dishwasher safe.  Home chocolate fountains normally hold 6 or fewer pounds of chocolate.

Chocolate 

Melted chocolate is very temperamental, so rich couverture chocolate, which is high in cocoa butter, is commonly used to ensure consistent flow. If the cocoa butter content of the chocolate is too low, an additive must be mixed in to decrease viscosity. (Vegetable oil is most commonly used to do this.)  But even couverture chocolate—unless specifically designed for fountains—often still requires an additive to make it flow smoothly.  Because of this, it is highly recommended that chocolate formulated specifically for fountains be used to avoid the need for the addition of vegetable oil, as the oil gives a slimy, gritty taste and texture to the chocolate.  Few chocolate fountains are capable of melting chocolate directly in the basin, so chocolate is typically melted in a microwave or double boiler before pouring it into the fountain.

The fluid dynamics of home chocolate fountains are particularly problematic (it is a so-called non Newtonian fluid), since the gravitational forces are much lower than the viscous forces; this means that small chocolate fountains need a very high proportion of vegetable oil. There is a trade-off between looks and taste: if perfect smooth flow may be sacrificed, it's possible to use non-oily chocolate.

A cheaper alternative to couverture chocolate is chocolate-flavored syrup, also called "chocolate coating".  Chocolate coating is already in liquid form and costs much less than couverture chocolate, though some connoisseurs prefer gourmet Belgian couverture despite the added expense. Another alternative is to use dark chocolate, such as 70% cocoa chocolate. This contains much less sugar, so it isn't so sticky; a small quantity of hot water may be added to thin it further.

Increasing popularity
Originally, the market was entirely commercial, with chocolate fountains costing a large amount of money and requiring significant upkeep. The popularity of chocolate fountains grew to a point of demand at a consumer retail level as people who had seen commercial models at catered events inquired about purchasing their own fountains. Then, at the end of 2004, the Hellmann Group began marketing the Nostalgia Chocolate Fountain for personal use.

This expansion into the retail market caused the demand to peak drastically. As a result, the catering industry saw more requests for chocolate fountains at events. Flavoring oils such as mint, orange, and cappuccino were developed to give the chocolate extra taste. Caterers began adding food coloring to white chocolate to make it coincide with special holidays or events.  Caterers and home users created special recipes for a variety of fondues that would flow well in a fountain; some of the more popular recipes included caramel, cheese, maple syrup, ranch dressing, and BBQ sauce.  Because of the growing practice of using chocolate fountains for other types of fondue, chocolate fountains became interchangeably referred to as "fondue fountains".

Today, commercial chocolate fountains are a common fixture at well-to-do galas, weddings, and catered parties; while home chocolate fountains are more commonly seen at birthday parties and friendly gatherings.

New models often incorporate more than one flavour of chocolate and a 'cup' design in place of the traditional tiered models. These models are designed to cater to new customer desires, to decrease the amount of chocolate needed and chocolate wastage.

The Jean-Philippe Patisserie at the Bellagio Casino in Paradise, Nevada is home to the world's tallest chocolate fountain.

See also

 List of chocolate-covered foods
 List of dips
 List of fondues

References 

Chocolate
Serving and dining
Chocolate-covered foods